Judge Elmore may refer to:

Christina Elmore (fl. 2010s–2020s), first African American female judge of the Michigan Seventeenth Circuit Court
Rick Elmore (fl. 1980s–2010s), judge of the North Carolina Court of Appeals
William Augustus Elmore (1812–1890), lawyer and judge in New Orleans, Louisiana